Denio can refer to:

People
 Amy Denio (born 1961), soundtrack composer and songwriter
 Elizabeth Denio (1842–1922), American teacher, first woman to teach at the University of Rochester
 Hiram Denio (1799–1871), American lawyer and politician, Chief Judge of the New York Court of Appeals
 Dênio Martins (born 1977), Brazilian footballer

See also
Samfundet De Nio, Swedish literary society